The women's K-1 500 metres event was an individual kayaking event conducted as part of the Canoeing at the 1968 Summer Olympics program. In the official report, heats were shown timed in tenths of a second (0.1) while the semifinal and final events were timed in hundredths of a second (0.01).

Medalists

Results

Heats
The 13 competitors first raced in two heats on October 22. The top three finishers from each of the heats advanced directly to the final while the rest competed in the semifinal two days later.

In the official report, Nüssner's surname is shown as Nübner and Svensson's first name is shown as Ing-Marie.

Semifinal
The top three finishers in the semifinal (raced on October 24) advanced to the final.

Final
The final was held on October 25.

Pfeffer capsized in the water midway through the final and had to be rescued by watercraft following the canoers.

References
1968 Summer Olympics official report Volume 3, Part 2. p. 617. 
Sports-reference.com 1968 women's K-1 500 m results.
Wallechinsky, David and Jaime Loucky (2008). "Canoeing: Women's Kayak Singles 500 Meters". In The Complete Book of the Olympics: 2008 Edition. London: Aurum Press Limited. p. 491.

Women's K-1 500
Olympic
Women's events at the 1968 Summer Olympics